The Guatemala–Mexico border is the international border between Guatemala and Mexico. The border measures  and runs between north and west Guatemala (the Guatemalan departments of San Marcos, Huehuetenango, El Quiché and El Petén) and the Mexican states of Campeche, Tabasco and Chiapas. The border includes stretches of the Usumacinta River, the Salinas River, and the Suchiate River.

Geopolitically, this border represents much of the western and northern boundary of the region of Central America within North America. It is across this border that most of the commerce between Mexico and Guatemala and the rest of Central America takes place.

History

In 1881, problems arose for Guatemala when President Justo Rufino Barrios claimed lands in Soconusco and Chiapas. The initial position of the Government of Mexico was not to accept discussion about their rights in that region. However, from 1882 began talks to resolve the problem between Matías Romero and Justo Rufino at The Winch at Hacienda de Barrios (Soconusco), where both had possessions. They decided to go to arbitration in the U.S (United States).

The preliminary agreement was signed in New York City on 12 August 1882, and it stated that:
"The Republic of Guatemala dispenses with the argument that has held about his rights to the territory of Chiapas and Soconusco department." 
The position of Mexico is well seated in their rights of those territories. The final boundary treaty was signed in Mexico City on September 27 of 1882. The first article provides that: "The Republic of Guatemala forever renounce rights that judges have on the territory of the State of Chiapas and Soconusco your district, and therefore considers the territory as part of the United Mexican States." As for the delineation of the border itself, Mexico and Guatemala agreed to use straight lines between key points known and accepted by both countries. The measurement and demarcation work was completed in 1902. Soconusco in Guatemala advanced to the Suchiate river and Mexico received the county of Motozintla.

Immigration issues

In 2006, Joseph Contreras profiled the entry of Guatemalan immigrants Mexico for Newsweek magazine and pointed out that while Mexican president Vicente Fox demanded that the United States grant legal residency to millions of Mexican immigrants, in Mexico 15,000 immigrants had been regularly registered. Additionally, Contreras found that at coffee farms in the state of Chiapas, "40,000 Guatemalan field hands endure backbreaking jobs and squalid living conditions to earn roughly [US]$3.50 a day" and that some farmers "even deduct the cost of room and board from that amount."

Programa Frontera Sur

Like the Mexico–United States border, Mexico has some fencing along its southern border with Guatemala. In July 2014, Mexico adopted the Programa Frontera Sur at the urging of the United States. The plan proposes "to overcome common challenges related to migration and respect for human rights" and to establish "a more modern, efficient, prosperous and secure border." Instead of building a wall and preventing people from crossing the border, Mexico relies on interior enforcement via layers of checkpoints staffed by the National Institute of Migration, the military police, the Mexican Army, and the Mexican Navy. The results of the enforcement program has been mixed with increased detentions and removals but also increased victimization of migrants by criminal gangs and corrupt government officials due to more dispersed flows as migrants use less travelled routes. In 2015, Mexican authorities arrested more than 170,000 Central Americans up from 120,000 in 2014. In 2016, according to the Mexican civil rights organization Meso-American Migration Movement (Movimiento Migrante Mesoamericano), over 400,000 migrants crossed Mexico's southern border with 20,000 of them dying or disappearing in Mexico due to criminal gangs, trafficking, or exposure to the elements.

Gun and drug running
The border with Guatemala is the primary source of military grade weaponry – including rocket-propelled grenades, hand grenades, plastic explosives, and grenade launchers – used by the Mexican drug cartels. The weapons are typically stolen from Central American government munitions stockpiles. A 2010 U.S. diplomatic cable disclosed by WikiLeaks states that Mexico does not have sufficient resources to patrol the border with only 125 officers to monitor the entire  border. Mexican officials confirm that they do not have sufficient resources as they have been concentrating their efforts on fighting the cartels in the North.

Cities and border crossings

In 2014, Mexico's border with Guatemala and Belize had 11 formal crossings (10 with Guatemala and 1 with Belize) and more than 370 informal crossings. As part of an effort known as Plan Frontera Sur (Southern Border Plan), which is intended to limit illegal Central American entry into the country, Mexico will increase the number of formal crossings.

Guatemala and Mexico had 10 formal border crossings in 2004:
Ciudad Hidalgo, Chiapas – Ciudad Tecún Umán, San Marcos
Talismán, Chiapas – El Carmen, San Marcos
Union Juárez, Chiapas – Toquían Grande, San Marcos
Mazapa de Madero, Chiapas – Sibinal, San Marcos
Ciudad Cuahtemoc, Chiapas –  La Mesilla, Huehuetenango
Carmen Xhán, Chiapas – Gracias a Dios, Huehuetenango
Nuevo Orizaba, Chiapas – Ingenieros, El Quiché
Frontera Corozal, Chiapas - Bethel, El Petén
El Ceibo, Tabasco – El Ceibo, El Petén
El Martillo, Tabasco – El Naranjo, El Petén

See also
 Belize–Mexico border
 Volcán Tacaná

References

 
Borders of Guatemala
Borders of Mexico
International borders